Ildar Magdeev (born 11 April 1984) is an Uzbek footballer who plays as a midfielder for FK Dinamo Samarqand.

Career
He played for FK Buxoro and Pakhtakor Tashkent before joining Lokomotiv Tashkent in 2012. In March 2013 he moved to another capital club, Oqtepa Toshkent to play in Uzbekistan First League. Magdeev joined FK Dinamo Samarqand in August 2013.

International
He made 23 appearances for Uzbekistan and scored one goal. Magdeev was also called to play for the national team at the 2007 AFC Asian Cup.

References

External links
 

1984 births
Living people
People from Bukhara
Uzbekistani footballers
Uzbekistani expatriate footballers
Uzbekistan international footballers
2007 AFC Asian Cup players
Qingdao Hainiu F.C. (1990) players
Chinese Super League players
Expatriate footballers in China
Uzbekistani expatriate sportspeople in China
Buxoro FK players
FK Dinamo Samarqand players
Footballers at the 2006 Asian Games
Pakhtakor Tashkent FK players
PFC Lokomotiv Tashkent players
Association football midfielders
Asian Games competitors for Uzbekistan